Thierry Beschefer, sometimes given as "Theodore", (Châlons-en-Champagne 25 March 1630 – Reims 4 February 1711), was a Jesuit missionary and became the superior of the Canadian mission.

Life
Thierry Beschefer was born at Châlons-sur-marne, 25 May 1630. He entered the Society of Jesus at Nancy, 24 May 1647, studied philosophy and theology at Pont-à-Mousson, taught humanities and rhetoric for seven years at various colleges in France. He was ordained in 1661. He returned to Pont-à-Mousson to teach rhetoric, and then classics at Metz. He made his profession as a Jesuit in August 1664.

The following year, Beschefer went to Canada. Upon his arrival at Quebec, the Jesuit superiors set him to learn the Huron language. He remained in Quebec, three years. In July 1666, he was part of a delegation sent by governor Alexandre de Prouville de Tracy to the English at New York, but a sudden outbreak of Indian hostilities compelled them to turn back. In 1670–71, however, he was sent to assist Father Jean Pierron at a mission among the Mohawks. This assignment proved particularly challenging due to the influence of the Dutch and English traders at Albany, who supplied the tribe with liquor.

In 1672, Beschefer returned to Quebec, where he performed a variety of functions. He became superior of the Canadian missions in 1680, retaining that office until 1686, when he became prefect the College of Quebec. In 1689 he returned to France, where he acted as procurator of the missions. In 1691 he embarked at Rochelle for Quebec, but had to forego the voyage because of ill health.

During his stay in Canada he was spiritual director of the Ursulines at Quebec, and their annals describe him as "a man of distinguished merit, and a director of great wisdom and experience."  

He died at Reims, 4 February 1711 at the age of eighty.

References

External links
 Biography at the Dictionary of Canadian Biography Online

17th-century Canadian Jesuits
1630 births
1711 deaths
Roman Catholic missionaries in Canada
Jesuit missionaries in New France
17th-century French Jesuits
French Roman Catholic missionaries
18th-century Canadian Jesuits